Brownedge St Mary's Catholic High School is a coeducational secondary school located in Bamber Bridge in the English county of Lancashire.

It is a voluntary aided school administered by Lancashire County Council and the Roman Catholic Diocese of Salford. The school offers GCSEs and vocational courses as programmes of study for pupils, with vocational courses offered in conjunction with local partner colleges.

References

External links
Brownedge St Mary's Catholic High School official website

Secondary schools in Lancashire
Catholic secondary schools in the Diocese of Salford
Voluntary aided schools in England
Schools in South Ribble